"Temper Temper" is a song by Welsh heavy metal band Bullet for My Valentine from their album Temper Temper. Its music video revolves around a group of people in a room with anger and fury issues. It is the only music video by the band without the members in it.

Background and critical response

The song was produced by Don Gilmore and released on 23 October 2012, which got radio airplay. The song, however, did receive criticism from some fans due to its sound change.

Personnel
 Matthew Tuck - lead vocals, rhythm guitar
 Michael "Padge" Paget – lead guitar, backing vocals
 Michael "Moose" Thomas – drums, percussion
 Jason James – bass guitar, backing vocals

Charts

References

External links
 

2012 singles
2012 songs
Bullet for My Valentine songs
Songs written by Matthew Tuck
Songs written by Michael Paget
Songs written by Jason James (musician)
RCA Records singles
Alternative metal songs